Prisoners of Love may refer to:
Prisoners of Love (fictional play), a fictional play in The Producers
Prisoners of Love: A Smattering of Scintillating Senescent Songs: 1985–2003, a compilation album by Yo La Tengo
"Prisoners of Love" (Danny Phantom), an episode of Danny Phantom
"Prisoners of Love" (Adventure Time episode), an episode of Adventure Time
"Prisoners of Love", an episode of True Colors
"Prisoners of Love", a short story by Dorothy Black
Prisoners of Love (1921 film), an American silent film starring Betty Compson
Prisoners of Love (1954 film), a West German film

See also
Prisoner of Love (disambiguation)